Yoshiro Mori is a Japanese mathematician working on commutative algebra who introduced the Mori–Nagata theorem and whose work led to Mori domains.

References

20th-century Japanese mathematicians
Year of birth missing
Possibly living people